For information on all University of the Incarnate Word sports, see Incarnate Word Cardinals
The Incarnate Word Cardinals women's basketball team is the women's basketball team that represents University of the Incarnate Word in San Antonio, Texas. The team currently competes in the Southland Conference. The Cardinals are coached by Jeff Dow.

The 2014–15 season is the second year of a four-year transitional period for Incarnate Word from D2 to D1. In years 2–4 Incarnate Word will be classified as a D1 school for scheduling purposes. They will play a full conference schedule, and they can win the regular season conference title. However Incarnate Word cannot participate in the conference tourney until the 2017–18 season, at which time they will also be able to enter the NCAA tournament, should they win the conference. Incarnate Word is eligible to participate in the WBI or WNIT should they be invited.

Postseason

NCAA Division I
The Cardinals have made one appearance in the NCAA Division I women's basketball tournament. They have a combined record of 0–1.

NCAA Division II
The Cardinals made one appearance in the NCAA Division II women's basketball tournament. They had a combined record of 0–1.

NAIA Division I
The Cardinals made two appearances in the NAIA Division I women's basketball tournament, with a combined record of 1–2.

References

External links